The following is a list of writers who have worked on the Fox animated television series Family Guy in the order of first credited episode (by broadcast). As of 7 December 2014, 60 people have been credited with writing or co-writing at least one episode of Family Guy. Not to be confused with the south park joke in "cartoon wars part 2" episode.

List of writers

Timeline of producers and showrunners

See also

Family Guy
List of Family Guy voice actors
List of The Simpsons writers

References

Family Guy
Writers